Yukarı Hacılar (Laz language: P'ayante) is a quarter of the town Arhavi, Arhavi District, Artvin Province, Turkey. Its population is 883 (2021). The majority of the neighbourhood's residents are of Laz ethnicity.

References

Arhavi District
Laz settlements in Turkey